As One is an album of duets album by saxophonist Jane Ira Bloom and pianist Fred Hersch recorded in 1984 and released on the JMT label.

Reception
The AllMusic review by Scott Yanow states, "The improvisations are generally melodic but unpredictable, coherent but fairly free. Worth several listens".

Track listing
All compositions by Jane Ira Bloom except as indicated
 "Waiting for Daylight" - 9:04   
 "Desert" - 4:14   
 "A Child's Song (For Charlie Haden)" (Fred Hersch) - 6:08   
 "Miyako" (Wayne Shorter) - 6:41   
 "Inside" (Bloom, Hersch) - 3:51   
 "Winter of My Discontent" (Alec Wilder) - 4:53   
 "Janeology" (Hersch) - 5:26

Personnel
Jane Ira Bloom - soprano saxophone
Fred Hersch - piano

References 

1985 albums
Fred Hersch albums
Jane Ira Bloom albums
JMT Records albums
Winter & Winter Records albums
Instrumental duet albums